Antanavas Manor is a former residential manor in Antanavas village, Kazlų Rūda municipality.

References

Manor houses in Lithuania